North High School is one of three public high schools in Eau Claire, Wisconsin, the other two being Memorial High School and McKinley Charter School. It was founded in 1962.

Academics
Advanced Placement (AP) classes are offered in English, art, music, science, social sciences, and math. Just under half of North students take AP classes.

Athletics
North High School has teams in football, cross country, soccer, golf, swimming and diving, tennis, volleyball, basketball, gymnastics, hockey, wrestling, dance, baseball, softball, and track and field. North competes as a Division One school within the Big Rivers Conference. The boys' baseball team won the WIAA state championship in 2011 and 2019., and the girls' hockey team won the 2018 state title.

Music
The music department at North High School offers band, orchestra, and choir, with groups available at all skill levels. The school's competitive show choir is nicknamed "Northernaires". North's Jazz 1 made it in to the Essentially Ellington High School Jazz Band Competition and Festival in New York in 2012.

Notable alumni
Zach Halmstad - entrepreneur and founder of JAMF Software
Mark Kosower - principal cello of the Cleveland Orchestra
Jeff Smith - member of the Wisconsin State Assembly

References

External links
North High School website
Eau Claire Area School District

Buildings and structures in Eau Claire, Wisconsin
Public high schools in Wisconsin
Educational institutions established in 1962
Schools in Eau Claire County, Wisconsin